The term Satsikhistavo was used in feudal Georgia to designate a military-administrative unit which was ruled by a Tsikhistavi (a person who was appointed by the King for this position). Later the feudal families were granted the right to inherit Satsikhhistavos, which made them parts of a Satavado. 

Satsikhistavo sometimes required a special tax, established especially as a Tsikhistavi’s income.

See also 
Tsikhistavi
Garrison

References 
 GSE, (1984) volume 11, page 237, Tbilisi.

Social history of Georgia (country)
Nobility of Georgia (country)
Noble titles of Georgia (country)
Titles
Georgian words and phrases